Oideas Gael (meaning "Instruction of the Irish") is an Irish language cultural centre in Glencolmcille, Co. Donegal. It was founded in 1984. One of the founders of Oideas Gael, and its current Language Director, is Liam Ó Cuinneagáin, the previous chairman (2002-2012) of Údarás na Gaeltachta.

See also
Gaeltacht
Irish language

External links
Oideas Gael website
Glencolmcille website

1984 establishments in Ireland
Cultural centres in Ireland
Irish culture
Irish language organisations